The Tennis Federation of Vojvodina is the regional governing body of tennis in Vojvodina, Serbia. The association's president is Milan Jerinkić. 

The federation has 40 member clubs. In 2008 the federation opened Serbia's first national tennis centre.

References

External links
Official website

Sport in Vojvodina
Tennis in Serbia
Tennis organizations